Quarry Wood may refer to:

Quarry Wood, Hinstock
Quarry Wood, Stockton-on-Tees
Quarry Wood, Kent